The Railbenders are an American country band formed in Denver, Colorado in 2000 by Jim Dalton and Tyson Murray. Westword Music Showcase named The Railbenders to be Denver's Top Country/Roots act in 2002 and 2003, they were also named "Best of the Underground" in 2004 by The Denver Post. Also in 2004, The Coors Brewing Company named The Railbenders The Coors Original 2004 New Sound Throwdown Champions which included a sponsorship.

The Railbenders have opened for Willie Nelson, ZZ Top, Peter Frampton, The Doobie Brothers Kenny Rogers, Charlie Daniels and Nickel Creek.

History

Music festivals
In 2007, The Railbenders performed at the Stagecoach Country Music Festival in Indio, CA, where they opened a stage that featured Emmylou Harris, Kris Kristofferson, Junior Brown, John Doe, Drive-By Truckers, and Alejandro Escovedo.
In 2008 The Railbenders were the only country music act at the Mile High Music Festival in Denver.

Musical style
Influenced by Johnny Cash, Waylon Jennings and Hank Williams, The Railbenders overall sound has been described as country, alt-country, outlaw country, and hard country. The members of The Railbenders all listened to punk rock growing up which they believe explains their musics harder edge. Many of the band's songs include the common themes of whiskey, women and Colorado.

Band members
Current members
 Jim Dalton - vocals, guitar
 Tyson Murray - upright bass
 Graham Haworth - drums 
 Tony "Nascar" Asnicar - guitar

Former members
 Gordon Beesley - drums
 Chris Flynn - guitar
 Glenn Taylor - pedal steel 
 Zach Boddicker - guitar

Discography
 Southbound - Released: Apr 24, 2001, Big Bender Records
 Segundo - Released: Aug 22, 2004, Big Bender Records
 Showdown - Released: Jan 19, 2006, Railbenders
 Rock 'n' Rail New Year's Eve - Released: Dec 31, 2007, Railbenders
 Like a Wheel - Released: Dec 11, 2009, Whiskey Road Records
 Time to Ride (single) - Released: Jan 20, 2014, James Dalton
 The Medicine Show - Released: December 15, 2017, Railbenders

References 

Country music groups from Colorado
Musical groups from Denver
Musical groups established in 2000